Devil's tongue another name for konjac,  a flowering plant of genus Amorphophallus. It may also refer to:

 Dominican Devil's Tongue, a hot pepper
 two species of cactus from genus Opuntia
 Opuntia humifusa
 Opuntia ammophila
 a nickname of Wenzhounese, which is spoken in Wenzhou, Zhejiang, China
 Devil's Tongue Battery a former artillery battery in the British Overseas Territory of Gibraltar.